R Is for Rocket (1962) is a short story collection by American writer  Ray Bradbury, compiled for Young Adult library sections. It contains fifteen stories from earlier Bradbury collections, and two previously uncollected stories.

Contents 
 "R Is for Rocket" (first published as "King of the Gray Spaces")
 "The End of the Beginning"
 "The Fog Horn"
 "The Rocket"
 "The Rocket Man"
 "The Golden Apples of the Sun"
 "A Sound of Thunder"
 "The Long Rain"
 "The Exiles"
 "Here There Be Tygers"
 "The Strawberry Window"
 "The Dragon"
 "The Gift"
 "Frost and Fire"
 "Uncle Einar"
 "The Time Machine"
 "The Sound of Summer Running"

References

Further reading

External links
 
 

1960 short story collections
Short story collections by Ray Bradbury
Doubleday (publisher) books